Mount Byron is a rural locality in the Somerset Region, Queensland, Australia.

Geography
The rugged terrain of the D'Aguilar Range in the east is protected within the D'Aguilar National Park. Lower elevations along Byron Creek, a tributary of the Stanley River, have been cleared of vegetation.

History
The locality takes its name from the mountain Mount Bryon.

Brown & Broad operated a timber sawmill at Mount Byron around 1912. By 1923 Raymond & Hossack were also operating a timber mill in the area.

Mining operations commenced in 1918.

Mount Byron State School opened on 29 May 1919 and closed on 17 January 1930.

A large bushfire occurred in October 1926.

Education 
There are no schools in Mount Byron. The nearest government primary schools are Dayboro State School in Dayboro to the east and Toogoolawah State School in Toogoolawah to the west. The nearest government secondary schools are Woodford State School (to Year 10) in Woodford to the north-east, Bray Park State High School in Bray Park to the south-east, Toogoolawah State High School (to Year 12) in Toogoolawah to the west, and Kilcoy State High School in Kilcoy to the north-west.

References

Suburbs of Somerset Region
Localities in Queensland